Silver(III) fluoride, AgF3, is an unstable, bright-red, diamagnetic compound containing silver in the unusual +3 oxidation state.  Its crystal structure is very similar to that of gold(III) fluoride: it is a polymer consisting of rectangular AgF4 units linked into chains by fluoro bridges.

Preparation 
AgF3 can be prepared by treating a solution containing tetrafluoroargentate(III) ions in anhydrous hydrogen fluoride with boron trifluoride; the potassium tetrafluoroargentate(III) was prepared by heating a stoichiometric mix of potassium and silver nitrate in a sealed container filled with pressurised fluorine gas at 400C for 24 hours, twice.  When dissolved in anhydrous HF, it decomposes spontaneously to Ag3F8 overnight at room temperature.  The high-valence silver compounds described in the thesis are notable for their variety of colours: KAgF4 is bright orange, AgF3 bright red, AgFAsF6 is deep blue, Ag3F8 deep red-brown, and Pd(AgF4)2 is lime-green.

Earlier preparations were more heroic, involving the use of krypton difluoride as fluorinating agent, and tended to produce the mixed-valence Ag3F8 which may be thought of as silver(II) tetrafluoroargentate(III); Ag2F5, which is (AgF)+AgF4−, is formed by reacting AgF3 with AgFAsF6.

References 

Fluorides
Silver compounds